The name Mahan was assigned to the following four United States Navy ships, in honor of Rear Admiral Alfred Thayer Mahan,  naval historian and theorist on sea power.

 USS Mahan (DD-102/DM-7): (DD-102) was a Wickes-class destroyer commissioned in 1918, and converted to the light minelayer DM-7 in 1920. She was decommissioned in 1930, and sold for scrap in 1931.
  was the lead ship of the Mahan-class destroyers; commissioned in 1936, disabled by Japanese aircraft and scuttled by friendly fire in 1944.
 USS Mahan (DLG-11/DDG-42): (DLG-11) was commissioned as a Farragut-class guided missile frigate in 1960, and reclassified as the guided missile destroyer (DDG-42) in 1975. She was decommissioned in 1993 and completely dismantled in 2004.
  was commissioned in 1998: the Arleigh Burke-class destroyer was still in service as of 2020.

United States Navy ship names